USS Hydra may refer to the following ships of the United States Navy:

 , was the light draft monitor Tunxis, renamed Hydra 15 June 1869, while laid up out of commission at League Island, Pennsylvania
 , was a cargo ship launched in 1943 and decommissioned 19 November 1943 and transferred to the US Army.

United States Navy ship names